USS Nellie Jackson (SP-1459) was a United States Navy patrol vessel in commission from 1917 to 1918.

Nellie Jackson was built as a civilian two-masted sail-and-steam schooner of the same name in 1896 by J. W. Brooks in Maryland. On 24 August 1917, the U.S. Navy acquired her from her owner, the Conservation Commission of Maryland, for use as a section patrol boat during World War I. She was commissioned as USS Nellie Jackson (SP-1459).

Nellie Jackson served on patrol duties, presumably in the Chesapeake Bay area, for the rest of World War I. She was decommissioned on 26 November 1918, and the Navy returned her to the Conservation Commission the same day.

Notes

References

Department of the Navy Naval History and Heritage Command Online Library of Selected Images: Civilian Ships: Nellie Jackson (Schooner, 1896). Served as USS Nellie Jackson (SP-1459) in 1917-1918
NavSource Online: Section Patrol Craft Photo Archive Nellie Jackson (SP 1459)

Maritime history of Maryland
Chesapeake Bay boats
Schooners of the United States Navy
Patrol vessels of the United States Navy
World War I patrol vessels of the United States
Ships built in Maryland
1896 ships